Andha Bichar ( blind judgement) is an action Bengali film made in 1990. A revenge drama, this film also re-made the Hindi film Dushman.

Plot

A fast-paced action thriller, with Mithun Chakraborty as the lead.
Rakesh (Chakraborty) – a small town boy – has been torn away from his father (Aloknath), mother (Tanuja), and sister (Dipa Sahi) due to crisis. Terror strikes in the family after Aloknath is sent to jail in fraudulent cases. He himself is on the run due to police threats. In due course, Rakesh meets Lakshmi (Mandakini) and love blossoms. Even though Rakesh tries being truthful, he enters a different world. Will Rakesh unite with his long lost family and lead a happy life with the love of his life?

Cast

Mithun Chakraborty
Tanuja
Alok Nath
Biplab Chatterjee
Mandakini
Sadashiv Amrapurkar
Vijay Arora
Deepa Sahi
Manik Dutta
Ranjeet
Tarun Ghosh

Soundtrack
The music was composed by R. D. Burman and the lyrics were penned by Swapan Chakraborty

References

External links
 

1990 films
Bengali-language Indian films
Films directed by Shakti Samanta
Films scored by R. D. Burman
1990s Bengali-language films
Bengali films remade in other languages